"J'aime les filles (si vous êtes comme ça téléphonez moi)" is a 1967 single by French singer-songwriter Jacques Dutronc.

It reached number 1 in the French singles chart for two weeks from 6 May 1967.

Court case
In 1977, Dutronc and co-writer Jacques Lanzmann sued an advertising agency for making use of an instrumental version of the song without permission. The agency successfully defended the claim, arguing that the extract they had used was identical in melody to an older song, differing only in rhythm. The case established a precedent in French law that applying a new rhythm to an existing tune does not create a new work for copyright purposes.

Track listing 
Words by Jacques Lanzmann and music by Jacques Dutronc.

Side A

Side B

Personnel 
Jacques Dutronc : voice, guitar, percussion
Hadi Kalafate : bass, percussion
Alain Le Govic (alias Alain Chamfort) : piano, organ
Jean-Pierre Alarcen : guitar
Jacques Pasut : rhythm guitar
Michel Pelay : drums

External links
Video of Jacques Dutronc performing "J'aime les filles" on the French TV show Palmarès des chansons, November 1966.

References

Jacques Dutronc songs
1967 singles
Pye Records singles
Songs written by Jacques Lanzmann
Songs written by Jacques Dutronc
1967 songs
Disques Vogue singles